The Mareb River, or Gash River is a river flowing out of central Eritrea.

Course 
Its headwaters rise south-west of Asmara in central Eritrea. It flows south, bordering Ethiopia, then west through western Eritrea to reach the Sudanese plains near Kassala. Unlike the Setit or Takazze rivers, which flow out of Ethiopia and also forms a natural border with Eritrea, the waters of the Mareb do usually not reach the Nile but dissipate in the sands of the eastern Sudanese plains.

The Mareb is dry for much of the year, but like the Takazze is subject to sudden floods during the rainy season; only the left bank of the upper course of the Mareb is in Ethiopian territory. Its main tributaries are the Obel River on the right bank (in Eritrea) and the Sarana, Balasa, Mai Shawesh, and 'Engweya Rivers on the left (in Ethiopia).

History 
The Mareb was important historically as the boundary between two separately governed regions in the area: the land of the Bahr negash (Tigrinya "kingdom of the sea", also known as Medri Bahri or "land of/by the sea") to the north of the river, and the Tigray to the south.

Wildlife 
The river's Eritrean floodplain was the location of a 2001 sighting of a sizable elephant herd, the first such sighting in Eritrea since 1955.

See also 
 List of rivers of Eritrea
 List of rivers of Ethiopia
 List of rivers of Sudan

References 

Rivers of Eritrea
Rivers of Ethiopia
Rivers of Sudan
International rivers of Africa
Eritrea–Ethiopia border
Border rivers